Edward Farrer (died 18 February 1691) was an Oxford academic and administrator. At the end of his life, he was Master of University College, Oxford for only two years, dying on his close-stool.

Farrer studied at the University of St Andrews, Trinity College, Cambridge, and Magdalen Hall, where he gained a Bachelor of Arts degree in January 1651.
Farrer was elected a Fellow of University College in 1651.

He was a curate at Flamstead in Hertfordshire for twenty-five years.

References 

Year of birth missing
1691 deaths
Alumni of the University of St Andrews
Alumni of Trinity College, Cambridge
Alumni of Magdalen Hall, Oxford
17th-century English Anglican priests
Fellows of University College, Oxford
Masters of University College, Oxford
People from Halifax, West Yorkshire
People from Flamstead